is a railway station in the city of Sano, Tochigi, Japan, operated by the private railway operator Tōbu Railway. The station is numbered "TI-32".

Lines

Station layout
Tajima Station has one island platform, connected to the station building by an underground passageway.

Platforms

Adjacent stations

History
Tajima Station opened on 2 August 1914.

From 17 March 2012, station numbering was introduced on all Tōbu lines, with Watarase Station becoming "TI-32".

Passenger statistics
In fiscal 2019, the station was used by an average of 132 passengers daily (boarding passengers only).

Surrounding area
 Japan National Route 50 – Sano Bypass
Haneda Industrial Park

See also
 List of railway stations in Japan

References

External links

 Tobu station information 
	

Tobu Sano Line
Stations of Tobu Railway
Railway stations in Tochigi Prefecture
Railway stations in Japan opened in 1914
Sano, Tochigi